Individualism and Economic Order is a book written by Friedrich Hayek. It is a collection of essays originally published in the 1930s and 1940s, discussing topics ranging from moral philosophy to the methods of the social sciences and economic theory to contrast free markets with planned economies. It contains several of his major contribution to the fields of economics, philosophy, and political science. Published in 1948, the book is widely considered a classic of libertarian thought. Hayek presents his vision of individualism as a cornerstone of economic and social theory.

The book's chapters have had a major impact on both economics and political philosophy. His arguments have been cited by many leading economists, including Nobel laureates like Elinor Ostrom, James M. Buchanan, and Milton Friedman, who have used Hayek's theories to shape their own work in these fields. It has also shaped the thinking of many libertarians who continue to use his concepts when arguing for the importance of individual freedom in modern economies.

Essays

"Individualism: True and False" 
This chapter was delivered at University College, Dublin, December 17, 1945. In it, Hayek argues that two basic tendencies have developed in thinking about Individualism, a British tendency and a French tendency. The British tendency emphasizes the limited abilities of human beings and therefore defends a social vision of emergent order through the rule of law and individual freedom. The French tendency emphasizes the greatness of humans' individual abilities, and therefore tends towards the view that individuals can create great societies through deliberate intention. This leads to the expansion of state authority and is therefore, in Hayek's view, a false individualism.

"Economics and Knowledge" 
Delivered at the London Economic Club, November 1936, this article argues the economic concept of an equilibrium can only be made coherent if economists understand equilibrium as being about the cessation of the revision of plans in light of newly acquired knowledge.

"The Facts of the Social Sciences" 
This chapter contains Hayek's argument that explanations of social behavior must be founded in the beliefs of the agents whose actions are being explained, not objective facts about the world or the opinions of the social scientist studying the behavior. It was delivered as a talk at the Cambridge University Moral Science Club, November 1942.

"The Use of Knowledge in Society" 
Published in the American Economic Review, September 1945.

"The Meaning of Competition" 
Hayek argues that the conventional definition of competition in economic theory, perfect competition, actually completely excludes any activity that can be meaningfully called competition. Rather, that theory describes a state of affairs that obtains after competition has completed. Derived from a paper delivered at Princeton University, May 1946.

"'Free' Enterprise and Competitive Order" 
Derived from a paper delivered to the Mont Pelerin Society, April 1947.

"Socialist Calculation I: The Nature and History of the Problem" 
Published in Collectivist Economic Planning (1935)

"Socialist Calculation II: The State of the Debate (1935)" 
Published in Collectivist Economic Planning (1935)

"Socialist Calculation III: The Competitive 'Solution'" 
Published in the Economica, May 1940.

"A Commodity Reserve Currency" 
Published in the Economic Journal,  June–September 1943.

"The Ricardo Effect" 
Published in Economica, May 1942.

"The Economic Conditions of Interstate Federalism" 
Published in the New Commonwealth Quarterly, September 1939.

References

External links

   at the Ludwig von Mises Institute

1948 non-fiction books
Political books
Books about capitalism
Philosophy books
Classical liberalism
Individualism
Books by Friedrich Hayek
Philosophy of social science
Books about philosophy of economics
Routledge books
University of Chicago Press books
Essay collections